Sherry Ross may refer to:

 Sherry Ross (c. 1954–), an American sports broadcaster and journalist
 Sherry Ross (pioneer) (1824–1867), an Oregon pioneer